The 1965 Middle Tennessee Blue Raiders football team represented Middle Tennessee State University—as a member of the Ohio Valley Conference (OVC) during the 1965 NCAA College Division football season. Led by 19th-year head coach Charles M. Murphy, the Blue Raiders compiled a record an overall record of 10–0 with a mark of 7–0 in conference play, winning the OVC title. The team's captains were K. Atchley and W. Randolph.

Schedule

References

Middle Tennessee
College football undefeated seasons
Middle Tennessee Blue Raiders football seasons
Ohio Valley Conference football champion seasons
Middle Tennessee Blue Raiders football